{{Automatic taxobox
|image = Musschia aurea (Madeira, Portugal).jpg
|image_caption = Musschia aurea 
|taxon = Musschia
|authority = Dumort.
|type_species = Musschia aurea 
|type_species_authority = (L.f.) Dumort.
|range_map = Musschia aurea, M. wollastonii e M. isambertoi - Arquipelago da Madeira (Portugal).jpg
|range_map_caption = Distribution of the genus: M. isambertoi (green), M. wollastonii (red), M. aurea (yellow)
|synonyms_ref = 
|synonyms =Chrysangia LinkBenaurea Raf.
}}Musschia is a genus of plants in the family Campanulaceae. It contains three known species, all endemic to the Madeira Archipelago in the eastern North Atlantic, part of the Republic of Portugal.Lammers, T.G. (2007). World checklist and bibliography of Campanulaceae: 1-675. The Board of Trustees of the Royal Botanic Gardens, Kew. The genus is named in honour of Jean-Henri Mussche (1765-1834), the head gardener of the botanical garden in Ghent.
 
 Musschia aurea (L.f.) Dumort. - Madeira Island
 Musschia isambertoi M.Seq., R.Jardim, Magda Silva & L.Carvalho - Desertas Islands
 Musschia wollastonii'' Lowe - Madeira Island

Notes

References

Campanuloideae
Campanulaceae genera
Endemic flora of Madeira